Fort Cobb is a town in Caddo County, Oklahoma, United States. The population was 634 at the 2010 census.

History
The fort was named after Secretary of the Treasury Howell Cobb, a friend of the founding officer, Major William Emory. The post was later occupied by both Southern and Northern forces during the Civil War, the Union taking control of the fort as part of the 1862 Tonkawa massacre.

Later, Lieutenant Colonel George Armstrong Custer's command was encamped at Fort Cobb from December 18, 1868, to January 6, 1869. Shortly after that, on March 12, 1869, the fort was abandoned in favor of a location  to the south near the Wichita Mountains, and renamed Fort Sill.

The town of Fort Cobb was founded in 1899, and simply named Cobb, which was renamed Fort Cobb in 1902 to honor the defunct military post. At statehood in 1907, the town had 467 residents. The number had fallen to 382 at the 1910 census, but grew to 546 in 1920. The largest number of residents was 827 in 1930, but soon began a steep decline because of the Great Depression and World War II. In 1940 it was 699, and falling to 665 in 1950. It rebounded to 687 in 1960, 722 in 1970 and 760 in 1980. There was another sharp drop to 663 in 1990, followed by a rise to 663 in 1990, 667 in 2000 and then declining again to 634 in 2010.

Geography
Fort Cobb is located west of the center of Caddo County at  (35.099581, -98.438498), in the valley of the Washita River. Oklahoma State Highway 9 passes through the town, leading east  to Anadarko, the county seat, and west  to Carnegie.

Demographics

As of the census of 2000, there were 667 people, 270 households, and 189 families residing in the town. There were 317 housing units at an average density of 621.2 per square mile (240.0/km2). The racial makeup of the town was 77.96% White, 1.20% African American, 16.04% Native American, 0.45% from other races, and 4.35% from two or more races. Hispanic or Latino of any race were 5.25% of the population.

There were 270 households, out of which 35.2% had children under the age of 18 living with them, 55.9% were married couples living together, 11.5% had a female householder with no husband present, and 30.0% were non-families. 28.1% of all households were made up of individuals, and 16.7% had someone living alone who was 65 years of age or older. The average household size was 2.47 and the average family size was 3.05.

In the town, the age distribution of the population shows 28.9% under the age of 18, 7.3% from 18 to 24, 26.7% from 25 to 44, 19.8% from 45 to 64, and 17.2% who were 65 years of age or older. The median age was 37 years. For every 100 females, there were 86.8 males. For every 100 females age 18 and over, there were 74.3 males.

The median income for a household in the town was $25,625, and the median income for a family was $34,000. Males had a median income of $26,786 versus $18,854 for females. The per capita income for the town was $15,085. About 12.5% of families and 17.6% of the population were below the poverty line, including 20.6% of those under age 18 and 17.8% of those age 65 or over.

Economy
During the first half of the 20th century, the local economy largely depended on agriculture. The town had two grain elevators and three cotton gins by 1930, and depended on the Chicago, Rock Island and Pacific Railroad (Rock Island), whose branch line ran between  Chickasha and Magnum.

Construction of Fort Cobb Dam and the adjacent park opened the town to tourism as a major economic force in the second half of the century.

Government
The town has a mayor-council form of government.

Education
 Caddo-Kiowa Technology Center

Media
The Fort Cobb News has served the town since 1958. Previous newspapers were: Caddo County Record, the Fort Cobb Express, and the Fort Cobb Record.

Notable people
 Gary Gray, formerly of the NBA's Cincinnati Royals
 Reggie Willits, former member of Major League Baseball's Los Angeles Angels organization
 Wendi Willits (older sibling of Reggie), formerly of the WNBA's Los Angeles Sparks

References

External links
 Encyclopedia of Oklahoma History and Culture - Fort Cobb (town)

Towns in Oklahoma
Towns in Caddo County, Oklahoma
Populated places established in 1899